The Sutjeska (lit. "gorge or canyon") is a 35 km-long river in eastern Bosnia and Herzegovina. It is a tributary of the Drina river, which it meets south of Foča.

Geography
The Sutjeska River could be considered main river basin largely located within Sutjeska National Park itself.

Tributaries

Tributaries of the Sutjeska are:
 left tributaries are Klobučarica Creek, Jabučnica Creek, and Hrčavka River;
 right tributaries are Suški Creek (also called Suha River or Creek Sušica), Prijevor Creek and Perućica Creek.

Ecology and ichthyofauna
Running mostly through the national park which mandates high level of protection, the river Sutjeska is rich in salmonides, mostly brown trout, and offers terrains for fly fishing. In its lower course the river is also important spawning ground for huchen which enter the river during spawning season from the Drina river.

Historical significance
It is famous for having been the site of the World War II Battle of the Sutjeska.

See also
 Skakavac Waterfall, Perućica
 Perućica
 Sutjeska National Park
 List of national parks of Bosnia and Herzegovina
 Tara (Drina)
 Piva (river)
 Drina
 Neretva

External links
Official website 
Sutjeska National Park - BH Tourism Official website

References

Rivers of Bosnia and Herzegovina
Hucho habitats in Bosnia and Herzegovina